Psorophora ferox is a medium-sized mosquito native to much of North and South America. It inhabits wet woodlands, laying its eggs in temporary pools filled with rainwater. Larvae develop during summer in North America. They are aggressive feeders and give painful bites. The mosquito is reported to be active during both day and night.

Description
The adult's thorax is covered in dark scales with flecks of lighter yellowish scales. The abdomen is mostly dark-scaled dorsally, and yellowish ventrally. These yellowish scales form apicolateral triangular patches. The dorsum reflects a purple color. The legs are largely dark with white scales on the last two tarsal segments. The female's wings range from around 3.7-4.0 mm. The proboscis is long and dark.

Range
Ps. ferox occurs throughout the eastern United States and southeastern Canada, south through Mexico, Central and South America, and the Caribbean.

Medical Significance
Ps. ferox carries a number of diseases, although it is not considered a major vector. It is known to carry Venezuelan equine encephalitis virus (VEE). It was found to be a minor vector of West Nile virus (WNV) in New York. Several viruses have been found in this mosquito in the Amazon, such as Una virus and Ilheus virus. In Central and South America, the mosquito carries the larvae of Dermatobia hominis, the human bot fly, a parasite whose larvae develop inside the flesh of a mammal host.

References

Aedini
Diptera of North America
Insects described in 1819